Steve Kramer may refer to:

 Steve Kramer (actor), American voice actor for many anime titles
 Steve Kramer (basketball) (born 1945), American basketball player
 Steve Kramer, musician with The Wallets

See also
 Stefan Kramer (disambiguation)
 Steven Cramer (born 1953), American poet